Arja Anna-Leena Siikala (formerly Kuusi, née Aarnisalo, born Helsinki, 1 January 1943, died Espoo, 27 February 2016) was a professor emeritus at the University of Helsinki, specialising in folk-belief, mythology, and shamanism, along with oral storytelling and traditionality.

Education and career 
Anna-Leena Siikala graduated as a Master of Philosophy from the University of Helsinki in 1968, took her licenciate degree in 1970, and Ph.D. in 1978. She was a professor of folkloristics at Helsinki 1995–2007. Siikala held the following professorships:

 1995–2007: Helsingin yliopisto, Professor of Folklore.
 1999–2004: Suomen Akatemia, Academy Professor.
 1988–1995: Joensuun yliopisto, Professor of Folklore Studies.
 1979–1982: Turun yliopiston folkloristiikan ja uskontotieteen vs. professori

She undertook fieldwork in Finland and the Cook Islands in Polynesia, and among the Finnic-speaking peoples of Russia, Udmurt people, the Komi peoples, and the Khanty people of Siberia.

Siikala's most important research projects were Myth, history, society: Ethnic/National Traditions in the Age of Globalization (1999–2004) and The Other Russia: Cultural Multiplicity in the Making (2004–2007). Together with Mihály Hoppál and Vladimir Napolskikh she edited the Encyclopaedia of Uralic Mythologies.

In 2009, Siikala was elected to the Akateemikko.

Publications
Anna-Leena Siikala had over 230 publications to her name. Key works are:

 The Rite Technique of the Siberian Shaman (Ph.D. thesis, FF Communications 220, 1978 and 1989).
 Interpreting Oral Narrative (FF Communications 245, 1990).
 
 Studies in Shamanism (Ethnologica Uralica 1992 and 1998, Budapest, with Mihály Hoppálin).
 Mythic Images and Shamanism. A Perspective on Kalevala Poetry (FF Communications 280, 2002).
 Return to Culture. Oral Tradition and Society in the Southern Cook Islands (FF Communications 287, 2005, with Jukka Siikalan).

References

1943 births
2016 deaths
Finnish folklore
Finnish folklorists
Academic staff of the University of Helsinki
University of Helsinki alumni